Egvad Parish is a parish in the Diocese of Haderslev in Aabenraa Municipality, Denmark.

References 

Parishes in Aabenraa Municipality
Parishes of Denmark